Vasković is a Serbian surname. Notable people with the surname include:

Boris Vasković (born 1975), Serbian footballer
Zoran Vasković (born 1979), Serbian footballer

See also
Vasović
Visković

Serbian surnames